Rumbos paralelos is a Mexican drama film written by Sharon Kleinberg and directed by Rafael Montero. The film is starring Ludwika Paleta and Iliana Fox. It premiered on May 20, 2016 in Mexico.

Plot 
Film tells the story of Gaby (Ludwika Paleta) and Silvia (Iliana Fox), who had their children the same day and in the same hospital. Without having any contact with each other, they raised their own in different contexts and according to their respective possibilities, taking into account that the first is a single mother by choice, while the other is married and also has a daughter. Thus, everything happens normally, until due to the illness of one of the children, they discover that moments after birth, they were exchanged by accident and, in fact, each has the child of the other. The complicated situation will not only lead to an emotional and moral crossroads, but will result in a complicated legal dispute.

Cast 
 Ludwika Paleta as Gaby
 Iliana Fox as Silvia
 Michel Brown as Armando
 Juan Ignacio Aranda as Director Hospital
 Arturo Barba as Franccesco
 Fernanda Castillo as Adriana
 Pilar Ixquic Mata as Abogada
 Sharon Kleinberg as Enfermera amable
 Juan Ríos Cantú as Lic. Huerta

References

External links